Matilda Maranda Crawford (Quackenbush; pen names, Maude Moore, M. M., Mrs. John Crawford; 21 July 1844 – 24 December 1920) was an American-Canadian newspaper correspondent and poet. Songs of All Seasons, Climes and Times: A Motley Jingle of Jumbled Rhymes was published in 1890. In addition to contributing to the literary press, Crawford was engaged in teaching.

Early life and education
Matilda (nicknames Mattie or Maty) Maranda Quackenbush was born in Clay, New York, near Syracuse, 21 July 1844. She was of German ancestry. Her father, Garret Quackenbush, was a laborer, and her mother, Sarah Reese, was a tailor.

In 1851, Crawford, her mother, and five older siblings removed to Consecon, Prince Edward County, Ontario, where Crawford attended a grammar school. Gifted with an active and retentive memory, each bit of poetry she heard was remembered, and when but a child, she recited at one time the whole of Oliver Goldsmith 's The Deserted Village. Quick to learn, by the age of twelve, she was at the head of her classes, but at this point, had not written a composition.

Career
As an adult, Crawford lived in Michigan for some time, and while there, she was engaged in teaching. It was at that point that she began to contribute to the literary press. In 1868, she returned to Canada, locating in Newtonville, Ontario. While there, she wrote for various Canadian and American newspapers as a pastime.

In 1871, she married John Crawford (1840-1912), of Clarke, Ontario. She had two children, a boy and girl (Maude). For a few years, she focused on domestic responsibilities and did not write. In 1887, an entire summer's illness afforded her leisure time for literary work, and thereafter, she wrote for the press again using various pen names, including "Maude Moore", "M. M.", and "Mrs. John Crawford".

Death
Crawford died of a stroke in Toronto, Ontario, Canada on 24 December 1920, and was buried at Port Hope Union Cemetery.

Selected works

 Songs of All Seasons, Climes and Times: A Motley Jingle of Jumbled Rhymes (1890)

Notes

References

Attribution

External links
 
 

1844 births
1920 deaths
19th-century American essayists
19th-century Canadian non-fiction writers
19th-century American women writers
19th-century Canadian women writers
19th-century American poets
19th-century Canadian poets
People from Clay, New York
Canadian newspaper reporters and correspondents
American newspaper reporters and correspondents
American women poets
Canadian women poets
American women essayists
Pseudonymous women writers
Canadian women non-fiction writers
19th-century pseudonymous writers
Wikipedia articles incorporating text from A Woman of the Century